Sex Blood Rock n' Roll is the "best of Vamps" album, released on September 25, 2013. It is also the first Vamp's album to be released overseas. In addition to the album including already released songs, it also includes new recordings of the same songs, as well as re-recording of all English songs, and a remix. The album reached number 2 on the Oricon chart.

Track listing

References 

2013 compilation albums
Vamps (band) albums